Nicolás Álvarez (born 8 June 1996) is a Peruvian tennis player.

On the junior tour, Álvarez has a career high ITF junior ranking of 17 achieved in March 2014.

Álvarez has a career high ATP singles ranking of 295 achieved on January 6, 2020. He also has a career high ATP doubles ranking of 345, achieved on March 2, 2020.

Álvarez has represented Peru at Davis Cup. In Davis Cup he has a win–loss record of 6–5.

Challenger and Futures/World Tennis Tour Finals

Singles: 9 (4-5)

Doubles 7 (2–5)

Davis Cup

Participations: (7–6)

   indicates the outcome of the Davis Cup match followed by the score, date, place of event, the zonal classification and its phase, and the court surface.

References

External links

1996 births
Living people
Peruvian male tennis players
Sportspeople from Lima
Tennis players at the 2014 Summer Youth Olympics
Tennis players at the 2019 Pan American Games
Pan American Games competitors for Peru
Duke Blue Devils men's tennis players
21st-century Peruvian people